The R230 generation of the Mercedes-Benz SL-Class was introduced at the 2001 Frankfurt Motor Show and 2001 Bologna Motor Show, replacing the R129. The R230 underwent revisions in 2006 and 2008, and was superseded by the new SL-Class R231 in 2011.

Development

In early 1996, over six years into the life of the R129, development work on a successor began. On 27 January 1996, design work commenced and draft designs were submitted from ten designers in Germany, California, and Japan. Hundreds of sketches were submitted and would form the basis for twelve quarter scale models which were digitized for computer manipulation. Design of the R230 would progress through two different formats. The real world process centered on the traditional 1:4 scale models, with most of them initially being done clay. Virtual world design development took place in a room packed with state-of-the-art computer processing technology referred to as the "CAVE" (Computer Aided Virtual Environment). This technology was also used earlier on to design the W203 in 1995.

The supercomputer in the "CAVE" was able to create full-size images of selected designs, using its five projectors and allowing designers to inspect every inch of every surface rendered. Parallel to the virtual process, the twelve scale models were scrutinized as well, with four standouts chosen to be created in full-size mockups. This evolution of the scale models occurred alongside the development of the interior design. On 16 June 1997, the final design for the R230 was approved by the board and refined into production specifications into 1998. The design patents for the R230 were later filed in Germany on 9 September 1999 and on 1 March 2000 in the United States.

In July 2001, after over five years of development, the new SL was unveiled and introduced at the 2001 Frankfurt Motor Show that September. Production began on 13 October 2001 at the Bremen plant and European sales commenced that November.

First generation
This car first appeared as the Safety Car for Formula One at the 2001 German Grand Prix in Hockenheim. The street version was unveiled at the 2001 IAA. The range was launched with a film style advertisement called Lucky Star.

Engines

2006 facelift

The SL underwent a facelift in 2006, and was unveiled at the 2006 Geneva Motor Show.

Changes include new engines for SL 350 and SL 500 (called SL 550 in North America), with improved performance on SL 55 AMG and SL 600, as well as a new top-of-the-line SL 65 AMG. ABC (Active Body Control) was improved to reduce body movements in dynamic driving by up to 60%, standard on all models except the SL 350. The new engines were mated to a new 7-speed 7G-Tronic automatic, with a Sport option to allow shifting to be performed up to 30% faster in manual "M" mode, and with added steering-wheel shift paddles.

Exterior styling changes include a new bumper with three large cooling air intakes and a more pronounced V-shape as well as fog lamps with chrome surrounds, new light-alloy wheels, new rear light. Interior changes include softer leather upholstery, new interior colours, high-quality metal door sills with Mercedes-Benz lettering and embossed aluminium trim elements, removable luggage cover, optional remote boot-lid release. The roof opening mechanism was also revised, reducing the opening time from 20 seconds to 16 seconds.

2007 – 50th Anniversary Edition SL 550

With the 2007 model year, there  was a limited production model (550 units) introduced to celebrate the 50th Anniversary of the SL roadster model. This Anniversary Edition version came with a pewter metallic exterior, cognac brown leather interior with black ash wood trim,  V8, exclusive twin-spoke rims, custom luggage bag for rear shelf, and many other standard options and features.

Engines

2008 facelift

The facelifted SL model was revealed in the Geneva Motor Show in March 2008. The SL received a new, more aggressive front end reflecting Mercedes's new design philosophy, with a pair of long powerdomes on the bonnet and a single-bar grille replacing the old three-bar effort. Improvements have been made also on the engines. Compared to the previous 3.5-litre engine, the output has been boosted by 16 percent. Torque has also been improved adding  to the previous  making it . This engine now can rev up to a max of 7200 rpm for a period as the oil temperature and other engine parameters permit, a higher compression ratio, a new intake manifold and featuring extensive modifications to and lightening of the valve train. In this case, however, the extra power does not come at the expense of fuel economy: with a consumption figure of 9.9 litres per 100 kilometres, the new SL 350 undercuts the previous model developing  by 0.4 litres per 100 kilometres. Mercedes-Benz is extending the SL-Class line-up by introducing an attractive entry-level model in the shape of the SL 280 developing . It features the AIRSCARF heating system used in the SLK.

AMG
The facelifted SL loses AMG's 5.4 L M113 in favour of the newer M156 6.2 L V8 used in the S63 AMG, CLK63 AMG, E63, and C63 AMG. The SL 63 AMG also includes the new AMG-developed 7-speed MCT "Multi Clutch Technology" automatic transmission.

The new MCT transmission is essentially the 7G-Tronic transmission without a torque converter. Instead of a torque converter, it uses a compact wet startup clutch to start the car off, and also supports computer-controlled double declutching. The MCT (Multi-Clutch Technology) acronym refers to a planetary (automatic) transmission's multiple clutches and bands for each gear.

The MCT is fitted with four drive modes: "C" (Comfort), "S" (Sport), "S+" (Sport plus), and "M" (Manual) and boasts 100 millisecond shifts in "M" mode. The new car features the new AMG DRIVE UNIT with innovative Race Start function. The AMG DRIVE UNIT is the central control unit for the AMG SPEEDSHIFT MCT 7-speed sports transmission and all driving dynamics functions. The driver can change gears either using the new AMG selector lever with its leather/ carbon-fibre finish, or by nudging the AMG steering-wheel shift paddles. The new Race start Function is a launch control system which enables the SL 63 AMG driver to call on maximum acceleration, while ensuring optimum traction of the driven wheels.

The new SL 65 AMG Black Series coupe features a carbon-fiber fixed roof, front fenders, hood, trunk lid, and front and rear aprons. With the absence of retractable roof hardware, the car is more than  lighter than the standard SL. This is the same 6.0 L engine as used in the previous SL 65 model with remapped timing and fuel curves to produce 58 PS more. Torque remains the same, as the previous model, due to transmission limitations. This engine has been labeled as the engine with the largest output that will be made by AMG. Its twin turbochargers are 12 percent larger, passages for intake air and the turbo wastegates have been modified, and the intake air intercooler is 30 percent more efficient.

SL 63 AMG Edition IWC (2008–)

It is a limited (200 units) version of SL 63 AMG. It included Designo Magno Kashmir white finish, AMG Exterior Carbon package with matte surface, interior Carbon matte trim with Tobago Brown nappa leather upholstery, AMG Performance package, 'Grosse Ingenieur' (Big Engineer) watch from Swiss watchmaker IWC Schaffhausen.

The vehicle went on sale beginning in fall 2008, with deliveries beginning in November 2008.

SL 65 AMG Black Series (2008–2011)

The performance version of the SL 65 AMG was unveiled in Monterey in 2008. The turbochargers are 12% larger, and the optimised wastegate ducts permit increased air throughout. The intake air ducting and exhaust system are modified to improve response and reduce the exhaust gas backpressure. The Black Series is  lighter than regular SL 65 AMG by the use of light carbon fibre composite (CFRP) parts and the omission of the SL's normal foldable hardtop roof, replacing it with a fixed roof. Not only did this save weight, it also made room available for the retractable rear spoiler.

The AMG Speedshift Plus five-speed automatic transmission include "C", "S", "M1", and "M2" which has gearshift times 25 percent quicker than the "M1" mode. The Black Series front axle track width is 97 millimetres wider and the rear axle track width 85 millimetres wider over regular model. Other changes include retractable rear spoiler and the rear apron with diffuser fins, 265/35R19 front tyres with 19×9.5 inch AMG light-alloy wheels and AMG 20×11.5-inch light-alloy wheels with 325/30R20 tyres (Dunlop Sport Maxx GT tyres), 6-piston front calipers with 390×36mm discs and 4-piston calipers with 360×26mm discs.

SL Night Edition (2010–)

It is a version of SL roadster in iconic matte black paint with 19-inch AMG five-spoke light-alloy wheels in a two-tone high-gloss finish, silver-painted front brake calipers with the Mercedes-Benz logo, darkened headlamps/tail lights, black nappa leather upholstery with shining chrome trim, seats with arrow-shaped seams and silver-coloured contrasting features, sports steering wheel and shift lever and roof lining in black, trim strip of the draught-stop has a high-gloss finish, silver-coloured vents at AIRSCARF system. Available only in model year 2011, there were 100 made.

Grand Edition (2011–)
It is a version of SL 300, SL 350, and SL 500 commemorating 125th anniversary of Karl Benz inventing the automobile.

SL 350 Grand Edition included 19-inch AMG 5-spoke alloy wheel in titanium, front brake callipers with the Mercedes-Benz logo, drill bench rated brake discs, twin chrome square exhaust tips, chrome shoulder line trim, high gloss door handle, Grand Edition side emblem, nappa leather seat, SLR design shift knob, prism pattern aluminium trim, silver colour AIRSCARF vent, chrome door sill plate, chrome draught strap, floor mat with Grand Edition logo, ashtray with Grand Edition logo. Other options include AMG sport package, designo piano lacquer black wood trim.

SL 500 Grand Edition included 19-inch AMG 5-spoke alloy wheel in titanium, front brake callipers with the Mercedes-Benz logo, drill bench rated brake discs, twin chrome square exhaust tips, chrome shoulder line trim, high gloss door handle, Grand Edition side emblem, SLR design shift knob, designo piano lacquer black wood trim, silver colour AIRSCARF vent, chrome door sill plate, chrome draught strap, floor mat with Grand Edition logo, ashtray with Grand Edition logo. Other options include AMG sport package.

Japan model went on sale in 2011-08-05.

Engines

Transmissions
SL 63 AMG includes AMG SPEEDSHIFT MCT 7-speed sports transmission, which included 'C' (Comfort), 'S' (Sport), 'S+' (Sport plus) and 'M' (Manual) modes, AMG DRIVE UNIT, Race Start launch control.

Production
The SL 63 AMG engine was built in Mercedes-AMG.

Models

SL 500
In 2007, Mercedes created a 75 limited-edition 50th Anniversary SL 550s.  According to another article, Mercedes created 550 of these cars, all pewter in colour with burgundy leather, black ash wood trim, 18-inch double five-spoked wheels, and matching 50th Anniversary Edition luggage.

SL 600
The SL 600 is the highest-powered version of the non-AMG SL-Class models. It accelerates from 0– in 4.7 seconds, according to Mercedes-Benz. However, the article can be subject to speculation that the car's performance may have been tested after modifications were made to the vehicle itself, although none are mentioned, hence the impressive 0– timing. Production of the SL 600 ended in 2009 leaving the SL 65 AMG as the only V12-engined R230 and R231.

SL 55 AMG / SL 63 AMG
The SL 55 AMG version was released in 2002. The SL 63 AMG version replaced it in 2008.

The new model has only slight visual differentiators, the most noticeable is the three-slat grille rather than the four-slat version used previously. The 6.2 litre V8 replaced the current engine for the 2009 model year. Upon release in 2002 this was for its time the fastest automatic car in the world. This was before the SLR Mclaren hit the market in 2003. Jeremy Clarkson owned one of the first SL 55 AMGs.

Mercedes engineers claimed that the SL 55 AMG could reach 208 mph if it was derestricted.

SL 65 AMG
The SL 65 AMG version offers  from its twin-turbocharged 5,980 cc V12 engine at 5500 rpm. It retailed for $179,720 as of 2005. Mercedes-Benz listed a 0– time of 4.2 seconds on their official website, though several road tests show that it actually takes under 4 seconds to reach .

References

Notes

Bibliography

External links

 SL-Class on Mercedes-Benz USA website
Press kit:
 Press Kit: The new Mercedes-Benz SL-Class
 Press Kit: Mercedes-Benz SL - 50 years of Roadster tradition
 Press Kit: The new generation Mercedes-Benz SL-Class

R230
R230
Cars introduced in 2001
Cars discontinued in 2011
2010s cars
Roadsters